The Danube barbel (Barbus balcanicus) is a species of freshwater fish widespread in southeastern Europe.  It is difficult to diagnose from e.g. Barbus carpathicus and Barbus petenyi in the field.

References

 

Barbus
Cyprinid fish of Europe
Fish described in 2002